CPI is the consumer price index, a measure of prices.
Consumer price index by country

CPI may also refer to:

Technology
Characters per inch, in typography
Cycles Per Instruction in microprocessors

Organizations

Center for Public Integrity
Centre for Process Innovation, UK
China Power Investment Corporation (CPI Group)
Commission on Public Integrity, Iraq
Committee on Public Information, US WWI organization
CPI International, US electronics company
Communist Party of India 
Communist Party of Iran
Communist Party of Ireland
Computer Peripherals Inc, a former printer maker
Constitutionalist Party of Iran
Congrès paléoethnologique international of the International Union for Prehistoric and Protohistoric Sciences 
Centrists for Italy, a political party in Italy
Italian Paralympic Committee (Comitato Paralimpico Italiano, CPI)

Other
California Psychological Inventory, a psychological test
Chinese Pidgin English, ISO 639-3 code
Corruption Perceptions Index, of countries
Cost Per Impression, in advertising
Cost performance index in earned value management